The Pick n Pay Group is a retail business in the fast-moving consumer goods industry. The Group operates through multiple store formats under three brands – Pick n Pay, Boxer and TM Supermarkets. Pick n Pay also operates one of the largest online grocery platforms in sub-Saharan Africa. Raymond Ackerman purchased the first four Pick n Pay stores in Cape Town, South Africa, in 1967 from Jack Goldin. Since then, the Group has grown to encompass stores across South Africa, Namibia, Botswana, Zambia, Nigeria, Eswatini and Lesotho. Pick n Pay also owns a 49% share of Zimbabwean supermarket chain, TM Supermarkets.

As of 2021, the company was operating at 1,994 locations across eight countries on the African continent.

Store types

 Pick n Pay Hypermarkets            21          (owned)
 Pick n Pay Supermarkets           530        (287 owned and 243 franchise)
 Pick n Pay Clothing                    255        (235 owned and 20 franchise)
 Pick n Pay Liquor                       506        (264 owned and 242 franchise)
 Pick n Pay Express                    174        (franchise)
 Pick n Pay Market stores            38          (Spaza partners)
 Boxer Supermarkets                   208        (owned)
 Boxer Punch                               17          (owned)
 Boxer Build                                 30          (owned)
 Boxer Liquor                               87          (owned)
 TM Supermarkets                       61          (associate – 33 trading as TM; 28 trading as Pick n Pay)

References

External links
Pick n Pay
www.picknpayinvestor.co.za

Retail companies established in 1967
Publicly traded companies
Food retailers
Companies listed on the Johannesburg Stock Exchange
Companies based in Cape Town
Retail companies of South Africa
1967 establishments in South Africa
South African brands